Guilty Wives is a stand-alone James Patterson novel, as it is not part any of the series novels written by Patterson.

Plot
This book is about four friends who are foreigners living in Bern, Switzerland, with their husbands. These four women decide to have a four-day holiday at a lavish resort overlooking Monte Carlo, on the French coast. For two days they have a lavish time, sunbathing at the pool, gambling with loads of money, dining on expensive food and drinking only the best champagne. On the second night they are invited to spend a night on an expensive yacht in the harbor. After having a drunken, indulgent night on the yacht they wake up to police raiding the harbor, taking everyone off all the boats there. Next, they find themselves accused of a horrible crime they did not commit. The only evidence implicates the four wives. They stand accused in court, facing years, if not their entire lives, in prison.

Reviews
Amazon.com, as of September 2012, had 384 reader reviews of Guilty Wives. Of a possible five stars the reviews gave the book an average of 3.5 stars. The Good Reads website, as of September 2012, had 864 reader reviews and 6,320 customer ratings. The raters gave Guilty Wives an average of 3.75 of a possible five stars.

References

2012 American novels
Little, Brown and Company books